The Lewisport Masonic Lodge, on 4th St. in Lewisport, Kentucky, is a masonic lodge that has been listed on the National Register of Historic Places since 1984.

It has an original pressed tin cornice, an original cast iron storefront, and an original pressed tin ceiling.

References

National Register of Historic Places in Hancock County, Kentucky
Masonic buildings in Kentucky
Clubhouses on the National Register of Historic Places in Kentucky